Carmel is a suburb of Perth, Western Australia, located within the City of Kalamunda. 

Prior to 1949 it was a stopping place on the Upper Darling Range Railway. The railway siding was originally known as Green's Landing after Perth businessman Levi Green, who had moved into the area in 1844. In 1915, the name Carmel, meaning "park" or "garden of God" in Hebrew, was adopted.

The transmission tower for Network 10 in Perth is located here.

References

External links

Suburbs of Perth, Western Australia
Suburbs in the City of Kalamunda